The International Challenge of Champions is an annual nine-ball pool tournament held at the Mohegan Sun in Uncasville, Connecticut. It has always been broadcast on ESPN and is sanctioned by the World Pool-Billiard Association. 

As of 2009, four invited notable players compete in this single-elimination event. Different from other pool tournaments, this is a winner-take-all event: The winner earns the entire purse of the division (men's or women's); in 2009, the men's-division pot was US$25,000. Winners of either division earn the title "Champion of Champions".

Format
Promoters describe the geared-for-television event as "international champions ... battling in short, sudden-death shootouts with pressure-cooker formats".

Each match is compose of two sets; each of them is race to 5 and in alternate break. Players lag to determine who shall break in the first set. The player who loses that set will break in the second.

A 30-second shot clock rule is used. This means a player must make a shot within 30 seconds lest the other player will receive ball-in-hand. Each player, however, can call for an extension but only once per rack.

Unlike other 9-ball tournaments, a player must call the 9-ball before pocketing it. Failing to call the shot or the 9-ball going in another pocket other than the one called will result the 9-ball being respotted and the player loses his turn at the table. Also, a player can't win a rack by pocketing the 9-ball in the break.

To win a match, a player has to win both sets. If the sets are split (one player winning the first but other player winning the next), players again lag to break at the one rack decider.

Winners

Men

Top performers

 In the event of identical records, players are sorted in alphabetical order by first name.

Women 
The tournament is along side the men's event and is called the "International Tournament of Champions".

References

Pool competitions